Charter Oak is a city in Crawford County, Iowa, United States, along the East Soldier River. The population was 535 at the 2020 census.

Geography
Charter Oak is located at  (42.067897, -95.589390).

Demographics

2010 census
As of the census of 2010, there were 502 people, 229 households, and 125 families living in the city. The racial makeup of the city was 95.6% White, 0.6% African American, 1.4% Asian, 1.0% from other races, and 1.4% from two or more races. Hispanic or Latino of any race were 7.2% of the population.

There were 229 households, of which 26.6% had children under the age of 18 living with them, 42.4% were married couples living together, 7.4% had a female householder with no husband present, 4.8% had a male householder with no wife present, and 45.4% were non-families. 41.5% of all households were made up of individuals, and 18.3% had someone living alone who was 65 years of age or older. The average household size was 2.19 and the average family size was 2.94.

The median age in the city was 42.5 years. 25.1% of residents were under the age of 18; 7.7% were between the ages of 18 and 24; 18.8% were from 25 to 44; 30.8% were from 45 to 64; and 17.9% were 65 years of age or older. The gender makeup of the city was 47.4% male and 52.6% female.

2000 census
As of the census of 2000, there were 530 people, 245 households, and 149 families living in the city. The racial makeup of the city was 99.62% White and 0.38% Asian. Hispanic or Latino of any race were 0.19% of the population.

There were 245 households, out of which 24.9% had children under the age of 18 living with them, 53.9% were married couples living together, 4.9% had a female householder with no husband present, and 38.8% were non-families. 37.6% of all households were made up of individuals, and 23.3% had someone living alone who was 65 years of age or older. The average household size was 2.16 and the average family size was 2.83.

In the city, the population was spread out, with 23.0% under the age of 18, 5.7% from 18 to 24, 24.7% from 25 to 44, 22.6% from 45 to 64, and 24.0% who were 65 years of age or older. The median age was 42 years. For every 100 females, there were 95.6 males. For every 100 females age 18 and over, there were 91.5 males.

The median income for a household in the city was $33,482, and the median income for a family was $40,781. Males had a median income of $26,838 versus $19,712 for females. The per capita income for the city was $16,583. About 3.1% of families and 5.5% of the population were below the poverty line, including none of those under age 18 and 14.4% of those age 65 or over.

Education
Charter Oak–Ute Community School District operates public schools.

References

Cities in Iowa
Cities in Crawford County, Iowa